PMMR 62 is a red supergiant star located in the Small Magellanic Cloud in the constellation Tucana. It is one of the largest stars known being 1,306 solar radii. If it was placed in the Solar System, it would engulf the orbit of Jupiter.

See also
 SMC 18136
 UY Scuti
 WOH G 64
 Stephenson 2-18
 VY Canis Majoris
 Westerlund 1-26

Notes

References

Tucana (constellation)
M-type supergiants
J00534794-7202095
PMMR objects
Extragalactic stars
Stars in the Small Magellanic Cloud
TIC objects